This is a list of Venetian governors of Kotor. The governors of Cattaro (modern Kotor) held the titles of conte (count), capitano (captain), rettore (rector), and provveditore (overseer). Kotor was under Venetian rule between 1420 and 1797.

List

Governors (rettore and provveditore)

Sources

Kotor
Venetian period in the history of Montenegro
Venetian governors
Republic of Venice-related lists